The Nevada Central Railroad was a  narrow gauge railroad completed in 1880 between Battle Mountain and Austin, Nevada. The railroad was constructed to connect Austin, the center of a rich silver mining area, with the transcontinental railroad, Southern Pacific, not the Western Pacific, at Battle Mountain.

However, by the time that the line was finished, the boom was almost over. Major silver production ended by 1887, although there was a slight revival later.

History
Austin was founded in 1862, as part of a silver rush reputedly triggered by a Pony Express rider, William Talcott whose horse kicked over a rock. By summer 1863, Austin and the surrounding Reese River Mining District had a population of over 10,000, and it became the county seat of Lander County. In 1871 the Manhattan Silver Mining Company had consolidated most of the claims. The company grew to have a lot of influence in the area and its secretary M..J. Farrell was the state senator for Lander County. Farrell set out to fix the lack of a railroad with a controversial project, approved only after a bitter debate in the 1874 legislature, overriding the Governor's veto. The legislature authorized Lander County in 1875 to grant a $200,000 of its bonds as a subsidy to build a railroad, a time limit of five years was set to finish the project.

The Nevada Central Railroad (NCRR)  wasn't started until 4 ½ years later, Anson Phelps Stokes the grandson of the founder of the Phelps Dodge Corporation and a partner in the mining company came to town. With Stokes involved he brought in General James H. Ledlie, a former Union officer in the Civil War. The crews went to work desperately, only to bring the line within  of the Austin town limits with less than a day left before the deadline. An emergency meeting of the Austin Town Board extended the town limits by two miles and the last rails were laid just minutes before the deadline. Nevada Central was only profitable as long as the mines at Austin were operating at full capacity. 

Stokes' son, James Graham Phelps Stokes, was president of the NCRR from 1898 to 1938. By the middle 1930s most of the mines that generated traffic at Battle Mountain were shut down and boarded up and the NCRR had passed into receivership for the last time in 1938.

Steam Locomotives

Remaining equipment

The Emma Nevada once named "Sidney Dillon" numbered 2 is an 1881 Baldwin Locomotive Works  "Mogul"  narrow gauge steam locomotive purchased by Disney animator Ward Kimball and his wife Betty for their backyard "Grizzly Flats Railroad" in 1938. Originally built for the short line Nevada Central Railroad connecting Battle Mountain with Austin, the beautifully restored locomotive features Kimball's own artwork on the cab and headlight and was finally fired up in 1942. Complaints of Kimball's neighbors because of the coal smoke forced Kimball to sideline the locomotive in 1951 and operated his railroad with a small  locomotive. Kimball, one of the Orange Empire Railway Museum's founders, donated the locomotive to the museum and it can be seen today in the museum's "Grizzly Flats" car barn.

References

Sources 
 
 
 
 https://web.archive.org/web/20060907004544/http://www.oerm.org/pages/GF.htm

Defunct Nevada railroads
3 ft gauge railways in the United States
Narrow gauge railroads in Nevada